Susan Melinda Yeagley is an American actress.

Early life and education
Yeagley was born in Nashville, Tennessee. She earned a Bachelor of Arts degree from the University of Southern California.

Career 
She portrayed Jessica Wicks in nine episodes of the comedy television series Parks and Recreation between 2009 and 2015. She had guest roles on television series ER, Friends, Reno 911!, Curb Your Enthusiasm, Miracles, Everybody Loves Raymond and The Sarah Silverman Program. She also had small roles in Almost Famous, Coyote Ugly, The Thin Pink Line, and others.

Personal life 
Yeagley married actor Kevin Nealon on September 3, 2005, in Bellagio, Italy. She gave birth to their first child, a son, in January 2007 in Santa Monica, California.

Filmography

Film

Television

References

External links

 Dame Delilah

20th-century American actresses
21st-century American actresses
Actresses from Nashville, Tennessee
American film actresses
American television actresses
Living people
University of Southern California alumni
Year of birth missing (living people)